Superstation (alternatively rendered as "super station" or informally as "SuperStation") is a term in North American broadcasting that has several meanings. Commonly, a "superstation" is a form of distant signal, a broadcast television signal—usually a commercially licensed station—that is retransmitted via communications satellite or microwave relay to multichannel television providers (including cable, direct broadcast satellite and IPTV services) over a broad area beyond its primary terrestrial signal range.

Outside of their originating media market, superstations are often treated akin to a conventional basic cable channel. Although six American television stations—none of which has widespread national distribution beyond home satellite or regional cable coverage—still are designated under this classification, these stations were primarily popularized between the late 1970s and the 1990s, in large part because of their carriage of sporting events from local professional sports franchises and theatrical feature films, offerings that were common of the time among independent stations that composed the superstation concept. These signals were also popular among C-band satellite subscribers in rural areas where broadcast signals could not be picked up off-air.

Individual radio stations have also been redistributed via satellite as superstations through cable radio services offered by television providers and standalone satellite radio services. In other parts of North America, the definition of what may constitute even a de facto superstation varies depending on the country and the overall availability of the distributed stations.

Definition
In its most precise meaning, per an amended definition under the Copyright Act of 1947, the Federal Communications Commission (FCC) in the United States defines a superstation as a "television broadcast station, other than a network station, licensed by the [FCC], that is secondarily transmitted by a satellite carrier." Superstations may fall into one of two classifications, based on the factoring of their extended reach for advertising and program acquisition purposes:
 Active superstations – Television stations that intentionally seek retransmission of their signal outside of their home market through an arrangement with a common satellite carrier firm (which uses an FCC-licensed satellite or satellite service facility to establish "point-to-multipoint" broadcast signal distribution, and which owns or leases a capacity or service on a satellite to provide such distribution), and markets the added distribution to program suppliers and advertisers; these stations target their programming and purchase advertising aimed at a national or regional audience, in addition to selling localized advertising viewable only on the originating broadcast feed;
 Passive superstations – Television stations that make little or no acknowledgement of their superstation status in on-air and other marketing avenues; the station's signal is involuntarily redistributed without prior formal consent by a satellite carrier, which handles national advertising, marketing and some programming services for the cable-originated feed in lieu of the station's licensee, which itself maintains a neutral or obstinate stance toward the expanded distribution. Locally, the "passive superstation" prioritizes programming and advertising for their originating market, charging rates for such acquisitions and sales accordingly. The station may receive supplementary revenue from federal royalty payments for licensee-copyrighted programs, but subscriber fees paid by cable systems for the use of their signals are distributed to the common carrier.

Through an amendment to the compulsory license statute of the 1947 copyright law, the Satellite Home Viewer Improvement Act of 1999 (SHVIA) created a sub-definition for "nationally distributed superstations," which the FCC constitutes as FCC-licensed television stations permitted by Congress for retransmission by satellite carriers regardless of whether they reach "served" or "unserved" subscribers pursuant to the Copyright Act (effectively preventing them from subjection to geographic retransmission restrictions and absolving them from copyright liability if received by subscribers not residing in "unserved households" that have limited to no access to television stations offering similar programming). These stations must also fit the following tight date-specific criteria:
 "(A) [the applicable station] is not owned or operated by or affiliated with a television network that, as of January 1, 1995, offered interconnected program service on a regular basis for 15 or more hours per week to at least 25 affiliated television licensees in ten or more states;"
 "(B) [the applicable station] on May 1, 1991, was retransmitted by a satellite carrier and was not a network station at that time; and
 "(C) [the applicable station] was, as of July 1, 1998, retransmitted by a satellite carrier under the statutory license of Section 119 of Title 17, United States Code."
Beyond the six stations that fit that criteria (including WPIX, KTLA and KWGN-TV, which, at present, uniquely constitute as both "network stations" as well as "nationally distributed superstations" under the FCC and the SHVIA's overlapping definitions for both), the definitions under SHVIA and Congressional retransmission consent rules (per Section 325 of U.S. Code Title 47, as amended through the enactment of SHVIA) are restrictive, leaving little possibility that any television stations would in the future be able to befit such criteria and legally be considered a national superstation.

While the FCC defines "superstation" as a term, it does not prohibit its use by others outside of that scope; for example, primary ABC/subchannel-only CW affiliate KYUR (channel 13) in Anchorage – which has a network of repeater stations in other parts of Alaska – had collectively branded its main station and repeaters as "The Alaska SuperStation" from 1996 to 2011. Some Spanish language networks like Telemundo and Univision may only have one station within an entire state that serves the largest city in their market and is distributed statewide via cable; one such case is Telemundo affiliate WYTU-LD (channel 63) in Milwaukee, which maintains cable distribution throughout Wisconsin via Charter Spectrum, along with extended coverage on low-power stations in Rockford, Illinois, and South Bend, Indiana, providing it broad coverage resembling a regional superstation though not marketing itself as such. The term has been (and, in a few cases, currently is) used by many other television and radio stations, but none of these operations is a superstation as defined by the FCC and solely use the term for marketing purposes. Similarly, the "superstation" term has also been occasionally stretched within the broadcasting industry to encompass major network affiliates imported by satellite common carriers to C-band and direct broadcast satellite providers—through packages such as Primetime 24 and its associated "Denver 5" tier, and the Netlink-distributed A3 package—that could not receive locally based network stations prior the implementation of the Satellite Television Extension and Localization Act in 1999.

United States

Early television superstations
In the early days of television broadcasting, most large media markets – primarily those ranked among the top 20 in Arbitron and Nielsen estimates – had, by standards of the period, a sizeable number of television stations (sometimes as many as eight or nine in operation). Generally, these markets had three VHF stations that operated as affiliates of the then dominant television networks – NBC, ABC, CBS, and FOX – one or more public television stations – which usually were member stations of National Educational Television (NET) and its later successor, the Public Broadcasting Service (PBS) – and one or more UHF stations, and in the largest markets (such as New York City, Los Angeles and Chicago), at least one VHF station without a network affiliation. These independent stations generally relied on syndicated reruns of current or defunct network shows, classic theatrical feature films and some variety of local programming – such as news programs (ranging from as limited as hourly news updates to long-form newscasts, usually airing in prime time and, in some cases, at midday), children's programming or sporting events – to fill their broadcast schedules. Because of the available population reach of the region, most mid-sized and smaller media markets often had only the basic three network-affiliated stations (either in the form of three standalone affiliates or a primary-secondary structure in which one or two stations carried programs selected among the schedules of two or all three major networks), with imported network affiliates often serving as default outlets where one or more networks were not available locally.

As CATV system capacity increased from three channels to five during the early 1950s, several communities in the Western U.S. began incorporating CATV systems using microwave relay systems that made it possible to retransmit broadcast signals over great distances. In September 1956, Columbia Television Co. in Pendleton, Oregon began using a microwave relay unit operated by Inland Microwave Co. to import three Spokane, Washington television stations, ABC affiliate KREM-TV (channel 2, now a CBS affiliate), CBS affiliate KXLY-TV (channel 4, now an ABC affiliate) and NBC affiliate KHQ-TV (channel 6), to its subscribers. Building on this, other cable and CATV systems in smaller municipalities and rural areas sought a foothold by "importing" broadcast television signals from larger nearby or distant cities for their customers, extending their reach beyond their normal coverage area (in the case of network-affiliated stations, this was to improve reception into areas that could not adequately receive the station's signal, whether within or at the edge of the contour, even with an outdoor antenna). Anxious for more viewers, the stations assisted by relaying their signals by wire or microwave transmission.

Within a few years, many other microwave-capable CATV system operators began to import out-of-market television signals based on program offerings they thought would appeal to their subscribers. In 1962, Oneonta, New York-based Eastern Microwave Inc. (EMI) – a company that was developed after a technician employed with the parent CATV system observed the operations of Montana-based microwave-to-CATV firm Western Microwave – was founded to relay the signals of WPIX, WNEW-TV and WOR-TV (channel 9, now MyNetworkTV owned-and-operated station WWOR-TV and licensed to Secaucus, New Jersey) to Oneonta Video and other CATV systems in surrounding areas. Eastern Microwave began distributing WOR-TV and either WPIX or WNEW (depending on the system) in March 1965 to three Upstate New York cable systems (Valley Cable Vision in Canajoharie, Carthage Video Division in Carthage and Cortland Video in Carthage). Other microwave firms were also developed to relay independent television stations to cable systems, including H&B Microwave (a subsidiary of H&B Communications Corp., a major provider of CATV service and microwave relays throughout the U.S.), which began retransmitting the signal of WGN-TV (channel 9) in Chicago to subscribers of the Dubuque TV-FM Cable Company in Dubuque, Iowa; WGN's signal soon began to be imported via microwave to other CATV systems throughout the Midwest.

Because of changes to cable television regulations in the 1960s and 1970s, carriage of out-of-market independent stations increased significantly, allowing for the development of the first true "regional superstations." By way of the microwave connections, Ted Turner began allowing the signal of Atlanta, Georgia independent station WTCG (channel 17, later renamed WTBS and now WPCH-TV) – which he purchased from station founder and fellow Atlanta-based entrepreneur Jack Rice Jr. in December 1969 in a $3-million all-stock transaction – to be distributed into other parts of the Southeastern United States (including Alabama, Tennessee and South Carolina). Two major independent station operators began extending coverage of their stations throughout their respective home states and even surrounding states. Gaylord Broadcasting began allowing its independents—WUAB (channel 43, now a CW affiliate) in Lorain–Cleveland, WVTV (channel 18, now a CW affiliate) in Milwaukee, KSTW (channel 11, now a CW owned-and-operated station) in Tacoma–Seattle, KTVT (channel 11, now a CBS owned-and-operated station) in Fort Worth–Dallas and KHTV (channel 39, now CW affiliate KIAH) in Houston—to be distributed to cable systems in their respective regions, as did the Christian Broadcasting Network's Continental Broadcasting Network unit for two of its religious-secular hybrid independents, WYAH-TV (channel 27, now CW affiliate WGNT) in Virginia Beach and KXTX-TV (channel 39, now a Telemundo owned-and-operated station) in Dallas–Fort Worth.

WTCG: The first national superstation
In December 1975, Ted Turner announced plans to redistribute Atlanta's WTCG via satellite to cable and C-band satellite services throughout the United States, beyond the 460,000 households in middle and southern Georgia and surrounding Deep South states that had been receiving its signal via microwave since the early 1970s. (Jack Matranga, then the president of KTXL [channel 40, now a Fox affiliate] also unveiled similar plans for his Sacramento, California independent, which were never formulated to fruition.) Turner conceptualized the idea upon hearing of premium cable service Home Box Office (HBO)'s groundbreaking innovation to retransmit its programming nationwide using communications satellites beginning with its September 30, 1975, telecast of the "Thrilla in Manila" boxing match. With a more cost-effective and expeditious distribution method in place than would be capable through setting up microwave and coaxial telephone relay systems across the entire country, Turner got his idea off the ground by founding Southern Satellite Systems (SSS) – a common carrier uplink provider based in Tulsa, Oklahoma – to serve as the station's satellite redistributor, and subsequently purchased an earth-to-satellite transmitting station to be set up outside of WTCG's Peachtree Street studios in Atlanta. To get around FCC rules in effect at the time that prohibited a common carrier from having involvement in program origination, Turner decided to sell SSS to former Western Union vice president of marketing Edward L. Taylor for $1 and sold the transmitting station to RCA American Communications. Upon the sale's consummation in March 1976, Turner reached an agreement with Taylor to have the firm uplink the WTCG signal to the Satcom 1 satellite.

WTCG became America's first nationally distributed superstation on December 17, 1976, when its signal began to be relayed to four cable systems in the Midwestern and Southeastern United States. At 1:00 pm. ET (12:00 pm. CT) that day, subscribers of Multi-Vue TV in Grand Island, Nebraska, Hampton Roads Cablevision in Newport News, Virginia, Troy Cablevision in Troy, Alabama and Newton Cable TV in Newton, Kansas began receiving WTCG's presentation of the 1948 Dana Andrews-Cesar Romero film Deep Waters (which had started on the Atlanta broadcast signal 30 minutes prior). Southern Satellite Systems initially charged prospective cable systems 10¢ per subscriber to transmit WTCG full-time and 2¢ per subscriber to carry it as an intermediary, post-sign-off timeshare service (from as early as midnight to as late as 6:00 a.m. local time). One key legal point in Turner's contracts with programming distributors and advertisers was that they continued to charge him for programming content and commercial time as if his station were reaching only a local market. No one had thought of adding contract language to deal with satellite-delivered broadcasts of a television station to a much larger region. Turner Communications Group also chose to revise its advertising rates to better reflect WTCG's national cable audience in October 1978.

Also setting WTCG apart from other superstations that would soon follow in its footsteps was that it directly promoted its programming to its national audience, made investments in programming production as well as acquisitions, and charged separate advertising rates at the national and local levels. Given Turner's deep pockets, the station paid for syndicated programming at (albeit reasonably cheaper) rates comparable to other national networks, rather than merely receiving royalty payments from cable systems for programs to which it held the copyright. Cable systems found WTCG—one of the few American television stations offering a 24-hour-a-day programming schedule at the time—an attractive offering as it had an extensive film library heavily reliant on classic feature films (amounting to 30 movies per week out of the 2,700 titles that Turner had accrued since taking over the station), high-profile syndicated programs and games from various Atlanta-area sports teams (including the Atlanta Braves Major League Baseball club, the Atlanta Hawks of the NBA - both of which were owned by Turner - and the Atlanta Flames of the NHL). Soon after it was uplinked, an increasing number of cable television systems throughout the United States sought to carry WTCG as part of their channel lineups, ultimately making it the most widely distributed superstation for the rest of its existence under the format. By May 1978, WTCG was being received by 1.5 million households in 45 states, with figures suggesting that its reach had been increasing at the rate of 100,000 cable households per month; by the end of that year, the station was available through cable systems in all 50 states. By July 1979, the station (by then, known as WTBS) was available to 4.8 million cable subscribers plus an additional 556,000 households that received the station through other distribution methods (including microwave and MMDS services). By 1987, WTBS was available to 41.6 million cable and satellite subscriber households nationwide.

As WTBS, the station also served to help promote Turner's subsequent cable efforts, providing simulcasts of Cable News Network (CNN) and CNN2 (later Headline News and now HLN) upon their launches in June 1980 and January 1982, respectively, as well as offering weekend-long marathons promoting the 1992 launch of Cartoon Network. (CNN also produced the station's only conventional, long-form news effort as a superstation, the TBS Evening News, a prime time newscast that ran from July 1980 to July 1984.) Aside from Turner's use of WTBS to help launch his other cable ventures, Southern Satellite Systems also distributed the United Press International (UPI) teletext news service (from 1978 to 1981) and the Electra teletext service (from 1981 to 1993) to the vertical blanking interval (VBI) of the WTBS feed. WTBS remained the most widely distributed superstation for the rest of its existence under the format; by 1987, WTBS was available to 41.6 million cable and satellite subscriber households nationwide. A separate feed of WTBS intended for distribution to cable providers outside the Atlanta market, incorporating national advertising substituting commercials intended for its Atlanta viewing audience, was launched in 1981. (Since the original incarnation of the syndication exclusivity rules had been repealed by that time, program substitutions on the national feed were very limited.)

WGN, WOR and other emerging superstations
Turner's innovation signaled the development of basic cable programming in the United States and, within three years of WTCG achieving national status, was soon copied by other common carrier firms who decided to apply for satellite uplinks to distribute other independent stations as national superstations; however, while Turner had aggressively pursued national availability for WTCG, the other superstations that would soon emerge did not purposely seek such widespread reach and were either recalcitrant about having their signals imported without consent or ignored the issue directly and allowed their newfound expanded distribution to continue unfettered.

On November 9, 1978, Chicago independent WGN-TV became America's second national superstation, when Tulsa, Oklahoma-based common carrier firm United Video Satellite Group, Inc. – one of four applicants, along with Southern Satellite Systems, Lansing, Michigan-based American Microwave & Communications and Milwaukee-based Midwestern Relay Company, that the FCC granted approval to operate satellite transponders to relay the signal following the institution of the FCC's distant signal "open entry" policy for carrier firms – uplinked its signal onto a Satcom-3 transponder for redistribution to cable and satellite subscribers. United Video stepped in to assert uplink responsibilities as SSS had become embroiled in a transponder lease dispute with RCA American Communications in pertinence to a lawsuit involving RCA American and SSS's Satellite Communication Systems joint venture over the use of Satcom Transponder 18. While TBS partnered with a satellite carrier to relay the WTBS Atlanta signal to a national audience, United Video used the legally structured loophole in the Copyright Act's compulsory license statute to uplink the signal of WGN without the prior consent of owner WGN Continental Broadcasting Company (later known as Tribune Broadcasting), a model that would be used for other superstations that emerged in the coming years. United Video did not compensate WGN directly for the retransmission of its signal, though the station and its parent company received royalty payments from cable systems that received the United Video-fed signal for any copyrighted programming (local newscasts, public affairs shows, locally originated children's programs and sports) that WGN owned and/or produced.

The station quickly turned into a major commodity among cable systems because of WGN's telecasts of Chicago Cubs and Chicago White Sox baseball, DePaul Blue Demons college basketball, and Chicago Bulls basketball games and its locally popular in-house children's programs like The Bozo Show (the Chicago iteration of the Bozo the Clown television franchise). As the first superstation that offered long-form newscasts (compared to the newsbriefs offered by WTCG/WTBS for most of the time until 1996 as well as an abbreviated daily satirical newscast, 17 Update Early in the Morning, which aired from 1976 to 1979 and mixed improvisational and scripted comedy with actual news content), upon moving its late evening newscast to 9:00 p.m. Central Time in March 1980, it also provided a prime time news alternative for viewers wanting to find out national and international headlines without having to wait for post-prime-time newscasts on local network stations, something of particular benefit to snowbirds and other Chicago residents who temporarily or permanently relocated elsewhere in the United States. Immediately after achieving superstation status, WGN-TV became available to an estimated approximately 200 cable systems and 1.5 million subscribers throughout the country; its distribution was heavily concentrated in the Central U.S. until the early 1980s and, by the end of the decade, had gradually expanded to encompass most of the nation with some gaps in the Northeastern U.S. that remained into the early 2010s. In 1985, Tribune—which would assume satellite distribution rights for the WGN national feed through its April 2001 purchase of the portion of United's UVTV unit that handled the feed's uplink and marketing responsibilities—began providing a direct microwave link of the WGN Chicago signal to United Video, providing it a second signal source in the event technical problems arose with the intercepted satellite signal and vice versa. WGN would become the only superstation to come close to reaching parity with WTBS, although it would continue to lag somewhat in coverage partly due to the two-year headstart of WTBS into the cable market.

KTVU (channel 2) in Oakland–San Francisco followed behind on December 16, 1978, when Satellite Communications Systems uplinked the station onto a Satcom-1 transponder. (Holiday Inns Inc. would withdraw from the Southern Satellite Systems partnership by April 1979, leaving the latter to handle uplink and promotional responsibilities for KTVU.) Despite a programming inventory comparable to other independents (including holding rights to San Francisco Giants baseball games), SCS was unsuccessful in marketing KTVU to cable systems to reach the level of WTBS, WGN-TV and WOR-TV. In April 1980, Warner-Amex Satellite Entertainment purchased the transponder space from SCS to distribute upstart music video channel MTV; KTVU's national cable distribution would be reduced to systems that already carried the station in the Western United States by early 1981.

Eastern Microwave was somewhat more successful in distributing WOR-TV (which had been available to cable and CATV systems via microwave throughout much of the Northeastern United States since 1965), when it began retransmitting the New York station's signal to cable affiliates and C-band satellite receivers throughout the remainder of the country over transponder 17 of Satcom I in April 1979. Until WOR adopted a 24-hour schedule in 1980, the satellite feed initially included a backup feed of CBS-owned New York City station WCBS-TV (channel 2) during WOR's off-hours. Even though WOR had a similar film library as other superstations (further boosted by the acquisition of the Universal Pictures film library when MCA Inc. acquired the station in a $387-million deal with the legally embattled RKO General in April 1987) and held rights to events from several New York-area professional sports teams (including the New York Mets, the New York Rangers, the New Jersey Devils and the New York Knicks as well as college basketball games involving Big East Conference universities), the station's distribution—while broad—was still relatively regionally scattered and paced far behind that of WTBS and WGN well into the 1990s.

United Video would eventually gain an oligopoly in superstation distribution throughout the 1980s, building on its success with WGN-TV by commencing distribution of three other superstations and handling marketing responsibilities for one more (including three that were owned by then-WGN parent Tribune Broadcasting). On May 1, 1984, United Video—which picked up the station's satellite retransmission rights from Southern Satellite Systems—uplinked the signal of WPIX to the Westar V satellite; this was followed on July 1, 1984, with its uplink of the signal of KTVT in Dallas–Fort Worth to the Satcom IV satellite, in a move undertaken by then-owner Gaylord Broadcasting to persuade cable providers that either already imported or were considering receiving the station's signal by microwave to begin transmitting the KTVT satellite feed. (United Video would later relocate KTVT's transponder to the Spacenet III in December 1988.) On October 24, 1987, Netlink—then a subsidiary of Tele-Communications Inc. (TCI)—began distributing KWGN-TV (channel 2, now a CW affiliate) over Satcom I as part of the company's "Denver 5" direct-to-home package of television stations from Colorado's state capital that also included five default network feeds for home dish subscribers without access to a local network affiliate: NBC owned-and-operated station KCNC-TV (channel 4, now a CBS owned-and-operated station), ABC affiliate KUSA-TV (channel 9, now an NBC affiliate), CBS affiliate KMGH-TV (channel 7, now an ABC affiliate), PBS station KRMA-TV (channel 6) and Fox affiliate KDVR (channel 31). (KWGN's satellite feed was limited in its availability to home dish users; although, at its peak, the station itself had cable carriage throughout Colorado's Western Slope, Idaho, Kansas, Montana, Nebraska, New Mexico, South Dakota, Utah, Washington and Wyoming.)

On February 15, 1988, Eastern Microwave Inc. began distributing WSBK-TV and KTLA (channel 5) in Los Angeles via the Satcom I-R satellite. (WSBK-TV was selected primarily for its broadcasts of Boston Bruins hockey and Boston Red Sox baseball games, while KTLA was selected for its broadcasts of Los Angeles Clippers basketball and California Angels baseball games.) EMI chose to encourage rather than compel cable systems in the Northeastern U.S. that already received WSBK by microwave to begin receiving the satellite feed, and outsourced marketing of the signals to home dish owners through HBO and TEMPO Enterprises. Both superstations were notable for being the first to have their signals scrambled from the outset, using the Videocipher II encryption system as well as the second and third EMI-delivered superstations to be encrypted, after having converted the WWOR satellite signal to an encrypted format in March 1986. (Within two months of EMI making the station available via satellite, United Video assumed marketing rights for KTLA under a partnership with Eastern Microwave.) Both services had their distribution limited primarily to the home dish market, whereas their cable distribution remained confined to their respective regions (New England for WSBK and the Southwestern United States for KTLA).

Unlike with WTCG/WTBS, Tribune Broadcasting (owners of WGN-TV, WPIX, KTLA and KWGN-TV until the completion of Tribune's purchase by Nexstar Media Group and concurring spin-off of WPIX to the E. W. Scripps Company in September 2019, with both successor parents inheriting the classification for those stations) and the various owners of WSBK (Gillett Communications, Paramount Stations Group and CBS Television Stations) have treated their satellite-delivered stations as "passive" superstations, opting to assert a neutral position over the relay of its signal by an intermediate common carrier to a national audience and leaving national promotional duties for multichannel television services and their subscribers to the satellite carriers that retransmitted their signals; in kind, neither station received direct compensation from United Video or EMI for retransmission or promotion of their signals but received royalty payments paid by carrier cable systems to the Copyright Royalty Tribunal (CRT) for their retransmission of programs that are copyrighted in the name of the individual stations and/or their respective parent companies. This benefited the stations as it allowed them to continue paying for syndicated programming and advertising at local rates rather than those comparable to other national networks.

Even so, WGN would gradually switch to a more "active" stance in later years; Tribune began relaying the station's Chicago broadcast feed to United Video directly in 1985, and eventually acquired a majority stake in the rechristened TV Guide Inc.'s UVTV satellite unit in April 2001 as the company was spinning off its satellite carrier assets to focus on TV Guides magazine, direct-to-cable program listings and interactive program guide services. Tribune, as a whole, had also shifted from opposing satellite retransmission of its stations sans permission to weighing in the benefits of having its stations be distributed to a wide audience, to the point of being in strong opposition against the reimposition of the syndicated exclusivity rules and filing court proceedings against major sports leagues that sought to prevent game telecasts involving local NBA and Major League Baseball teams from being imported to other media markets.

Distant signal regulation and conflicts
During the 1960s, the FCC began to severely restrict the importation of distant signals by larger CATV and cable systems, limiting their distribution to smaller-market and rural systems, based in part on the framework of the 1963 Carter Mountain Transmission Corp. v. FCC case, which stemmed from a legal challenge by Chief Washakie TV, then-owner of KWRB-TV (channel 10, now KFNE and operating a satellite station of Casper Fox affiliate KLWY) in Riverton, Wyoming, against the FCC license of Cody-based microwave relay firm Carter Mountain Transmission Corp., which intended to relay the signal of CBS/NBC affiliate KTWO-TV (channel 2) in Casper, Wyoming to CATV systems in three cities that were within the range of KWRB's off-air signal: Riverton, Lander and Thermopolis. The FCC's denial of Carter's license renewal—because of its refusal to guarantee KWRB program duplication protection and the harm it would induce to the station, especially given Carter's refusal to offer the KWRB signal—was affirmed in a unanimous, three-judge decision by the U.S. Court of Appeals for the District of Columbia on May 24, 1963, and a consideration refusal on the case by the U.S. Supreme Court on December 19.

Further expansion of "proto-superstation" signals came through federal court rulings on separate lawsuits filed in July 1961 by United Artists and WSTV Inc. (then-owner of WSTV [channel 9, now WTOV-TV] in Steubenville, Ohio) over Fortnightly Corp.'s importation of television stations from the Pittsburgh, Pennsylvania and Wheeling, West Virginia–Steubenville, Ohio markets to its Fairmont and Clarksburg, West Virginia systems and in December 1964 by CBS (over TelePrompTer's importation of stations from New York City, Albuquerque, New Mexico, Billings, Montana and Denver, Colorado to its systems in Elmira, New York, Johnstown, Pennsylvania and Farmington, New Mexico). In the former case, the Supreme Court ruled in a 5–1 vote on June 18, 1968, that CATV systems like Fortnightly did not incur copyright liability by retransmitting distant signals as they acted more akin to "viewers" than broadcasters; the latter case, ruled on May 2, 1972, by Judge Constance Baker Motley of the U.S. District Court for the Southern District of New York, affirmed that stance based on the Supreme Court's framework on the Fortnightly v. United Artists case.

On March 31, 1972, the FCC implemented a broad package of cable industry regulations passed that February, which included two rules pertaining to distant signal importation. Among the implemented rules was the original incarnation of the Syndication Exclusivity Rules (or "SyndEx"), which required cable providers to black out any syndicated programs carried on out-of-market stations if a television station exclusively holds the local broadcast rights to a particular program, even if the out-of-market station has the same owner as the program's claimant station. The main difference between the original Syndex law and the version enacted in 1988 was that the blackout provisions applied to almost all programming, including special event programs distributed through syndication (such as the Jerry Lewis MDA Telethon and the Easter Seals Telethon). The distant signal regulations allowed cable systems in the 100 largest markets to carry imported signals as a matter of right (including the addition of two distant signals not already available in the market), restricted cable systems in smaller markets to only being able to carry three network stations and one independent station (except for undefinable markets that would not be limited in the number of carried imported signals), and instituted leapfrogging rules that required systems importing distant independent stations from the top-25 markets to choose from one or both of the two markets closest to the provider's city of license and any systems carrying the signal of a third independent being required to pick up a UHF or, if such a station is not available, VHF station located within a  radius. This interpretation of the rules became increasingly difficult to enforce as the number of cable-originated services increased, particularly following the emergence of communications satellites as a distribution method to the cable industry beginning in 1975.

FCC soon began outlining a regulatory framework that allowed cable systems to import some out-of-market signals without running into copyright liability. In August 1975, the agency began allowing unlimited signal importation upon either the final daily sign-off of a local "must carry" station or starting at 1:00 a.m. (Eastern and Pacific Time)/12:00 a.m. (in all other time zones), to avoid programming conflicts with late-night programing being carried "in progress" or avoid instances in which systems would have to run a blank screen until the start of the next program. As such, the distant signal would act as a timeshare feed on a cable channel otherwise occupied by a local or out-of-market broadcast station during the occupying station's normal sign-off period. The last major obstacle to the creation of a national superstation was knocked down on December 19, 1975, when the FCC unanimously voted to repeal a 1972 rule requiring cable systems selecting a distant signal from among television stations in the top-25 media markets to only select a station from one of the two closest markets to the licensed system. The FCC Cable Television Bureau contended the formation of superstations was unlikely due to the absence of evidence that television stations economically benefited from cable carriage.

On October 1, 1976, the U.S. Congress unanimously passed the Copyright Act of 1976 in separate Senate floor and House voice votes. The law provides cable systems with a compulsory license – which, under Section 111, also applies to "passive" (passthrough) satellite carriers, allowing them to retransmit "copyrighted programming from any over-the-air [television and radio] stations across the country [or, with range restrictions based on their distance from the U.S. border, from Canada or Mexico]" without seeking the originating station's express permission – that requires payment of a flat semi-annual royalty fee based both on the number of distant signals retransmitted by the system and on their total subscriber receipts (0.675% of their gross receipts for the first distant signal, 0.425% for any other signal up to the fourth and 0.2% for each signal beyond the fourth, with a separate fixed-rate exemptions for systems that have a semi-annual revenue either below $80,000 or between $80,000 and $160,000), prohibits any modifications to the imported broadcast signal and its copyrighted content (such as commercials substituted by the cable system, permitting local broadcast stations to sue the systems if violating modifications are made), and established the Copyright Royalty Tribunal, a five-member commission of the U.S. Copyright Office that is tasked with reviewing cable and other royalty rates every five years (or sooner, if changes to program exclusivity or signal importation rules are made by the FCC) and compensates eligible owners of a copyrighted program who submit a written claim to receive the mandatory royalty paid by the cable system. Compulsory license rules for broadcast signal distribution were extended to the home satellite industry on October 21, 1988, through the passage of Satellite Home Viewer Act of 1988, which also restricted access to network programs exclusively to home dish users in "white areas" where broadcast signals are unviewable via antenna or cable (a provision that would become pertinent to most of the remaining superstations following network launches that took place in 1995).

The distribution of these superstations eventually caused conflicts between these stations and providers of similar, or identical, programming in local markets. Among the earliest opponents to the emergence of superstations was the Motion Picture Association of America (MPAA), which in 1977, with the growing distribution of WTCG, petitioned the FCC to investigate the impact of and regulate superstations amid concerns over the potential financial losses for programs that MPAA member companies distributed to other television stations, which it posited would not be offset by royalty payments by cable systems. (The MPAA, which had its inquiry petition backed by the National Association of Broadcasters [NAB] and broadcasting companies such as Kelly Broadcasting, McGraw-Hill Broadcasting and Taft Television & Radio Company, also lodged an unsuccessful bit to deny SSS's application to grant an expansion of WTCG's service to Puerto Rico, Alaska and Canada.)

On October 25, 1978, the FCC implemented an "open entry" policy for satellite resale carriers wanting to feed local television stations to cable systems, a move that would pave the way for the emergence of additional superstations. The policy also commenced review on FCC applications filed by four individual satellite carriers to authorize relay of other independent stations through the Satcom satellite fleet:
 Southern Satellite Systems – seeking to carry KTTV (channel 11, now a Fox owned-and-operated station) in Los Angeles and WPIX (channel 11, now a CW affiliate) in New York City;
 Satellite Communication Systems (a joint venture of Holiday Inns and SSS) – seeking to relay KTVU in Oakland–San Francisco;
 Eastern Microwave Inc. (a subsidiary of Newhouse Newspapers) – seeking to relay WOR-TV (channel 9, now Secaucus, New Jersey-licensed MyNetworkTV owned-and-operated station WWOR-TV) in New York City and WSBK-TV (channel 38, now an independent station) in Boston;
 and United Video, which also sought to relay WOR (without an overnight backup feed) and WSBK.
Reactions to the FCC's 1978 "open entry" policy ruling among program distributors ranged from "anger to passive acceptance," with concerns that satellite-distributed superstations would not adequately compensate program syndicators based on the acquired program's national availability and provide difficulty for program sales once content was sold to broadcasters in smaller markets with superstation importation via cable. Then on November 4, the FCC rescinded a provision requiring cable systems seeking a waiver of signal importation limits to prove the unique circumstances that justified the waiver, while still requiring them to show that local stations would not suffer adverse public service impacts as a result of ratings or revenue losses from the imported signal, an action that was considered a greenlight to the creation of additional national superstations.

While most superstations took on a passive stance on their distribution—programming to their local audience while benefiting tacitly from their extended distribution—a small number attempted to fight efforts to be redistributed; in March 1979, Metromedia—which was fighting an FCC grant allowing ASN Inc. (which also had been given permission to uplink WGN-TV and WOR-TV) to make KTTV an "involuntary superstation," claiming such retransmission would be a violation of a provision of Section 325 of the Communications Act that prohibited signal retransmission without a broadcaster's express consent, even though Section 111 of the 1976 Copyright Act effectively allowed such importation – asked the FCC to temporarily halt all authority for the satellite distribution and marketing of superstation signals. Concurrent with the Metromedia petition, the NAB—later to be joined in the petition by, among others, the MPAA, the NBA, the National Hockey League (NHL), Major League Baseball Commissioner Bowie Kuhn, WGN Continental Broadcasting and ABC—urged the FCC to conduct an expedited rulemaking aimed at curbing "the harmful impact of superstation development on broadcast program service to the public," positing that they posed a serious threat to the ability of program producers to guarantee exclusive local rights to prospective stations seeking to buy programs being offered on the syndication market. ASN rebutted that KTTV had acknowledged the company was being authorized to redistribute its programming without distributor permission as the station could not do it on its own without shouldering liability. The issue was never fully settled, however, as ASN Inc. ceased operations amid financial issues before it could be able to retransmit KTTV's signal.

The FCC repealed its remaining cable television regulations in a 4–3 vote on July 22, 1980, eliminating its restrictions on the number of broadcast stations that cable systems could carry and syndication exclusivity protections for local television stations on the basis that "local stations are not adversely affected when a cable system offers subscribers signals from television stations in other cities." The repeal of its signal importation and Syndex rules resulted in many cable systems beginning to carry other national superstations and additional regional out-of-market independents. The following day (July 23), television station owner Malrite Broadcasting (later Malrite Communications) filed a lawsuit in United States Court of Appeals for the Eastern District of New York to stop the rules from going into effect. The National Association of Broadcasters and Field Communications subsequently filed stay motions to the FCC (which denied the requests) until the Malrite suit was adjudicated, amid concerns over harm that the repeal could incur to station revenue and local viewership of syndicated programs if the same program could be duplicated by superstations and other distant signals. On June 19, 1981, the three-judge New York Court of Appeals panel unanimously affirmed the distant signal and syndication exclusivity repeals; after multiple delays, the repeal of both regulations went into effect one week later on June 24. The U.S. Supreme Court also affirmed the repeal by declining a request by the NAB to review the FCC order in January 1982.

Interpretations of the copyright act also led to legal cases against superstation distributors. In April 1981, Tribune Broadcasting filed a copyright infringement suit against United Video in the United States District Court for the Northern District of Illinois, on grounds that United inserted teletext content from its Dow Jones business news service over the satellite feed's vertical blanking interval (VBI) during retransmissions of WGN's newscasts and other local programs in place of the teletext listings data that the station was relaying to United's Electronic Program Guide (EPG) service (later Prevue Guide and now the entertainment-based Pop) in violation of the Copyright Act's passive carrier rules. In October 1981, District Court Judge Susan Getzendanner denied an injunction to WGN Continental Broadcasting and dismissed the United Video case, determining that United was not required to carry the station's teletext transmission. The U.S. Court of Appeals for the Northern District of Illinois disagreed, ruling in August 1982 that United Video must retransmit WGN-TV's VBI teletext where directly related to and part of the 9:00 p.m. news simulcast, noting that United had no grounds to claim the unseen teletext exempted it from copyright liability as the Copyright Act's definition of what constitutes as a public performance was broad enough to encompass indirect transmission through cable affiliates.

The MPAA, the NAB (despite its insistence that the CRT had limited to no authority to set rates outside the mandatory five-year interval), sports leagues and other copyright holders soon asked the Copyright Office to hike its royalty rates to compensate for the loss of the distant signal carriage and syndication exclusivity deregulation. On October 22, 1982, the Copyright Royalty Tribunal instituted a statutory license rate adjustment, establishing a 3.75% royalty fee of a cable system's gross receipts from subscribers (if their semi-annual revenue exceeds $214,000) for carriage of each previously impermissible distant signal and a SyndEx surcharge for programs transmitted on a previously blackout-subjected imported signal that was added after the rules were repealed, alongside existing royalties paid to the CRT "Basic Fund". The increase met with backlash from cable industry executives and lobbyists, led by National Cable Television Association (NCTA) President Tom Wheeler, who were concerned that it would result in the remove of superstations and other distant signal and harm independent stations that are supported by the extended audience. By the time the fees were imposed on March 15 (which was dubbed by cable systems as "Black Tuesday for Cable Viewers"), NCTA estimates showed that about 6.3 million subscribers nationwide had lost access to one or more distant signals because of defections by cable systems that wanted to avoid paying the increased copyright fees. Dating back weeks prior to the deadline (as some systems chose to remove imported signals after the CRT delayed the fee imposition), various distant signals experienced a combined loss of 493 cable clearances, with WTBS, WGN-TV and WOR-TV making up half the defections with a combined loss of 249 clearances. Other cable-originated services benefited from the fee increases and distant signal defections, with the Cable Health Network (CHN; merged with Daytime in 1984 to form Lifetime) experiencing the most growth; by March 1983, 1.2 million of the 9.1 million subscribers that CHN had at the time came from cable systems that replaced a distant signal with the channel. (Later estimates showed that WTBS lost 320,000 subscribers, while Eastern Microwave recouped around 200,000 subscribers for WOR and United Video recouped around 600,000 of its CRT-related losses of 1.2 million subscribers by May 1983.)

On May 18, 1988, the FCC passed a new version of the Syndication Exclusivity Rights Rule. The new policy—spurred in part by a 1987 study conducted by the Association of Independent Television Stations (INTV), which provided evidence that programming duplication between superstations and local stations created significant ratings dilution for the latter group in certain time periods and a resulting significant loss of advertising revenue—not only allowed television stations to claim local exclusivity over syndicated programs (even if the out-of-market station has the same owner as the station with that particular exclusive program) and required cable systems to black out claimed programs; it also granted cable systems or carrier firms the ability to secure an agreement with the claimant station or a syndication distributor to continue carrying a claimed program through an out-of-market station, allowing some superstations to acquire partial or exclusive national cable rights to certain programs. The law also closed the terrestrial loophole that allowed superstations like WGN and WTBS to continue paying local single market rates for programming acquisitions even as they were gaining national coverage, whilst selling that extended coverage to advertisers; this change made it so that other local stations which had their signals beamed to a satellite transponder – whether willingly or not – were charged appropriately for program content based on their actual national distribution, depending on arrangements with any given syndicator.

A major concern brought about by the new rules was that it would force cable systems to drop certain superstations altogether, rather than shoulder expenses that would be incurred with the resultant blackouts and any responsibilities for acquiring substitute programming, thereby denying viewers access to sporting events popular among subscribers who received those signals. In preparation for the policy's implementation – which took effect on January 1, 1990, after FCC-enforced delays in the regulation's rollout – some superstations decided to indemnify cable systems from potential blackouts by ensuring that, at least, some programs that could be subjected to local syndication exclusivity claims could continue to be shown to their national audience, so as to prevent the loss of sports access. WTBS effectively limited the number of necessary blackouts or substitutions by licensing the majority of its programming for carriage on both its national and Atlanta area feeds. (Certain local programs carried by the station, such as public affairs and educational children's programs, were not carried on the TBS national feed, but these omissions were because those programs were strictly intended to fulfill local obligations for public affairs content.)

United Video and Eastern Microwave respectively opted to devise standalone national feeds of WGN and WWOR, each incorporating an alternate schedule differing from the local broadcast signal to some degree—comprising both programs aired by the parent station for which the companies were able to secure the national retransmission rights (including some held over from before the SyndEx law was enacted), and supplementary programs acquired specifically for the national cable feed to absolve any holes caused by exclusivity claims—as well as separate national advertising, and in the case of WWOR, local advertising sold by individual cable systems. This would be achieved by "splitting" the signal, often requiring the use of a separate transponder to switch between the local feed and the alternate programming feed, so that certain programs viewed in the station's home market could be easily replaced with separate content that would only be shown over the national cable feed. While United Video made efforts to clear as much of the programming seen on the WGN Chicago feed as it possibly could, EMI increasingly filled the national WWOR EMI Service feed with library content distributed by Universal Television, MGM Television and Quinn Martin—consisting of classic television series from the 1950s to the 1970s—as well as select programs from the Christian Science Monitor television service, alongside shows on WWOR's local program schedule that it was able to acquire retransmission rights at the national level (including local newscasts, sports and other WWOR-produced programming as well as special events, the station's overnight simulcast of the Shop at Home Network and a limited number of syndicated shows that did not have exclusivity claims in any market). Confusingly for WWOR's national cable viewers, on-air promotions for programs not contracted to air nationally over the EMI Service were shown unaltered during simulcasts of programs aired on the New York signal. (This was not an issue with the WGN national feed, as United Video chose to substitute program promotions for shows airing on the Chicago signal that were not cleared on the national feed with those for the replacement shows exclusively seen on the latter, albeit still using station logos and promotional graphics used by the Chicago broadcast feed).

To blunt potential subscriber complaints over widespread programming blackouts, many cable systems removed both regional and quasi-national superstations (like WSBK, WPIX and KTVT) as well as other distant signals that their satellite carriers were unable or unwilling to take immediate steps to ensure their programming was "Syndex-proofed" to avoid blackouts. WGN and WTBS saw little negative impact to their distribution following the Syndex implementation, with WGN actually heavily benefiting from provider removals of other superstations (including then sister station WPIX) during the early 1990s, allowing for further expansion of its distribution reach. EMI estimated simultaneous losses of 500,000 subscribers and an increase of around one million households to its cable distribution of WWOR, the latter being attributed to some local cable systems adding the Syndex-proof WWOR EMI Service feed. Most complaints over the removal of some regional and quasi-national superstations were because of the loss of access to coverage from regional professional sports teams (such as the Boston Red Sox via WSBK, the Texas Rangers and Dallas Mavericks via KTVT and the New York Yankees via WPIX), leading some systems to resort to cherrypicking sports from the removed superstations to mollify subscribers and local politicians acceding to complaints from their constituents by pushing other cable systems to seek solutions to resume sporting events lost through the removal of those superstations. (For example, amid public pressure from the Providence City Council and Rhode Island Department of Public Utilities and Carriers, Dimension Cable Services's Providence, Rhode Island system [now operated by Cox Communications], which removed the 24-hour WPIX feed upon the Syndex rollout, began placing the station's Yankees telecasts on a local origination channel in May 1990, in exchange for paying United Video full-time copyright fees.) The WWOR EMI Service—despite having SyndEx-proofed its programming schedule—and WPIX would each see their distribution erode during the early 1990s, as some of the cable affiliates that carried either superstation began replacing them with the WGN national feed.

The passage of the Satellite Home Viewer Act of 1988 on October 19, 1988, extended the compulsory license to direct-to-home (DTH) satellite services, protecting distribution of broadcast signals to dish owners under existing copyright statutes. (The act's provisions primarily benefited so-called "affiliate superstations," provided that the distant network stations could only be distributed to "unserved households" that were unable to receive a local affiliate off-air.) For many years after the passage of SyndEx for cable systems, the satellite television industry remained exempt from syndication exclusivity regulations, resulting in subscribers of direct broadcast satellite and C-Band providers continuing to be able to view all programming seen on the local broadcast signals of national and regional superstations (except where the provider already offered the SyndEx-compliant cable feed). An FCC inquiry on whether SyndEx rules should be applied to home dish services concluded in January 1991 that extending those rules to satellite "would be technically and economically infeasible" as equipment that would allow programs to be selectively blacked out based on the media market would not likely be marketed until after the initial compulsory license expired in 1994 and that the expense of "preventing viewing by a relatively few authorized home satellite dish owners for a relatively short period" would be greater than that incurred by cable providers.

Copyright laws pertaining to broadcast signal carriage by satellite providers were eventually overhauled through amendments to the Communications Act of 1996 that were added through the November 1999 implementation of the Satellite Home Viewer Improvement Act (SHVIA), which allowed satellite providers to carry local broadcast signals on the Congressionally-suggested condition that the FCC develop rules protecting the sports, network and syndicated programming rights of local broadcasters. On November 2, 2000, the FCC approved identical network non-duplication, syndication exclusivity and sports blackout rules applying to the six FCC-designated national superstations (WGN-TV, KTLA, WPIX, KWGN-TV, WSBK-TV and WWOR-TV) and, in the case of the sports blackouts, other distant signals retransmitted over home dish units to an extent where it would be "technically feasible and not economically prohibitive;" this statute would eventually limit distribution of the five grandfathered stations to rural areas without distributors of similar programming. The rules, which took effect on November 30 and also applied to satellite common carriers that uplinked and distributed the superstations, gave satellite providers at least four months to implement duplication protections for network and syndicated programs and 60 days notice to comply with sports and programming blackout requests. An exemption to the Communications Act's retransmission consent statute in the SHVIA rules allowed satellite carriers to retransmit a superstation signal absent the station's prior written consent under the latter two aspects of the aforementioned FCC-defined "national superstation" criteria, provided that the service complies with the non-duplication, syndication exclusivity and sports blackout rules. (TBS was not covered under the SHVIA's de facto distant signal grandfathering clause as its national feed was considered a technically separate entity from its over-the-air parent feed in Atlanta. The act's network non-duplication and Syndex rules were thought to negatively affect the distribution of WGN as its national feed was compliant with those restrictions.) The Satellite Home Viewer Extension and Reauthorization Act (SHVERA), signed into law on December 8, 2004, allowed satellite providers to carry "significantly viewed" superstations and distant network signals to subscribers royalty-free and with the payment of retransmission consent, provided that the subscriber also receives local stations from the provider, and permitted providers to deliver superstations to commercial businesses.

Conflicts with professional sports leagues 
Much of the appeal of superstations to viewers came from the national carriage of sporting events involving professional league teams that contracted their telecasts to the originating stations within home markets. Although professional sports teams benefited heavily from their national exposure—especially with regards to WTCG/WTBS's carriage of the Atlanta Braves and the Atlanta Hawks, and WGN-TV's broadcasts of sporting events featuring the Chicago Cubs, Chicago White Sox and Chicago Bulls—superstation broadcasts of National Basketball Association (NBA) and Major League Baseball (MLB) games were met with resistance from league commissioners, who contended these telecasts—regardless of the positive effects on team loyalty—diluted the value of their national television contracts with other broadcast and cable networks. Some superstation operators (like Ted Turner and former Tribune Company vice president John Madigan) note a lack of corroborating evidence of any negative effects on game attendance and league revenue, suggesting that sports leagues have used superstation telecasts of their games as a scapegoat for financial problems incurred by the league caused by other factors such as the performance of certain teams and management issues.

The only federal restrictions applying to sports events shown on superstations and other imported signals was the so-called "same-game rule," enacted by the FCC in June 1975 to prohibit cable systems from retransmitting a sports event through a distant signal within a  zone around the city of the home team's arena if the game is not airing on a local television broadcaster, with a subsequent amendment requiring the broadcast rights-holder to inform local cable systems of game deletions no later than Monday of the preceding calendar week of the proposed deletion. (Other leagues had proposed a broader blackout zone: the National Hockey League [NHL] suggested that the protection zone should be extended across a team's entire home market, while the National Football League [NFL] and Major League Baseball each advocated for a  zone, with the latter also seeking a  zone around the cities of minor league franchises and a  zone around a team's local television rights-holder.) The major professional sports leagues eventually imposed their own broadcasting restrictions around the number of games that could air annually on any out-of-market stations, which resulted in superstations sometimes substituting sports events with syndicated programming and feature films in adherence. (This had an adverse effect on WGN, WWOR and WPIX, which each had news departments, as some of their respective newscasts would be subjected to substitutions if a sports event—particularly one shown during prime time—was preempted.)

One of the first known legal efforts to challenge superstation telecasts of sports events came in April 1981, when Eastern Microwave Inc. filed a declaratory judgement inquiry in the United States District Court for the Northern District of New York, contending that its cable retransmissions of WOR's New York Mets telecasts did not constitute copyright infringement. Mets owner Doubleday Sports Inc. contended it had the right to control the telecasts outside of its home market and informed EMI that the telecasts would be recorded upon transmission, effectively subjecting them to copyright by Doubleday; EMI contended that it was exempt from paying royalties for the telecasts under Section 111 (a) (3) of the Copyright Act, which contends that the secondary transmission of a program by an intermediary carrier did not infringe upon a copyright if the carrier had "no direct or indirect control over the content or selection of the primary transmission or over the particular recipients of the secondary transmission," and if the carrier's transmission activities only pertained to providing "wires, cables or other communications channels for the use of others." On March 12, 1982, District Judge Neal P. McCurn ruled that EMI and other satellite carriers were liable for royalty payments to program suppliers. The United States Court of Appeals for the Second Circuit (in a reversal of the Central District Court decision on October 20) and the Supreme Court (in a February 25, 1983, decision refusing review of the case) both concurred with EMI's arguments, holding that the company constituted as a "passive" carrier exempt from copyright fee payments—along with noting that EMI had only one available transponder for its extraterrestrial services and "naturally" sought to re-transmit "a marketable station"—under the Copyright Act's existing structure.

Outside of the teams that benefited from the broader exposure the telecasts gave them, Major League Baseball had long felt that superstations ate into their ability to gain revenue from agreements with national networks like ESPN. (As a comparison, in 1992, ESPN televised 175 baseball games as part of a broader $100-million-per year deal at a per-game cost of $571,428, about 12 times more than what TBS, WGN, WWOR and WPIX paid cumulatively for their respective team-based packages that year, encompassing a combined 435 games for an annual fee of $20 million or a per-game cost of $46,000). A succession of three MLB Commissioners—which, among the position's responsibilities, handles negotiations for all national broadcasting contracts but is prohibited under the federal compulsory license law from controlling carriage of superstation telecasts—attempted to curb the telecasts or convince superstations to pay a higher fee for the national telecasts to varying success. After Bowie Kuhn was appointed Commissioner in 1981, team owners lobbied the league to place a tax on superstation telecasts; the proposed tax passed in a 24–2 vote (with the Braves and the Cubs dissenting). Other legal attempts by Kuhn and league management to reduce the superstation telecasts ultimately failed because of federal copyright laws that protected the broadcasts. The tax was implemented in January 1985, under successor Peter Ueberroth, with Ted Turner becoming the first MLB team owner to agree to the revenue-sharing plan, under which he made annual contributions to the league's Central Fund for the continued right to carry Braves baseball games over WTBS. The Tribune Company (then-owner of WGN and WPIX, the former of which cited its absent accounting of its national cable audience in its advertising rates for its initial participation reluctance, as well as the Cubs), MCA Inc. (then owner of WWOR) and Gaylord Broadcasting (then owner of KTVT) soon each agreed to contribute to the fund for the right to air Cubs, White Sox, Yankees, Mets and Rangers games outside the teams' respective home markets. (The total payment reflected the reach of each superstation; by 1992, Turner and the Cubs paid $12 million and $6 million, respectively, reflecting WTBS's 58-million subscriber audience and WGN's 35 million subscribers at the time, whereas WWOR and WPIX each chipped in only $1 million, better reflecting their more regionalized distribution.).

Concerns by many of Major League Baseball team owners that the share would be used to buoy the expansion of KTVT into a fourth national superstation (a move that would have had to be undertaken by United Video as it was the station's satellite redistributor), American League team owners voted down Gaylord Broadcasting President Edward L. Gaylord's initial bid to purchase 33% of the Texas Rangers on January 11, 1985, in a 9–5 confirmation vote (below the two-thirds votes needed to approve the sale). Ueberroth would invoke a "best interests of baseball" clause on February 8 to approve the sale and associated broadcast contract with KTVT, which required Gaylord Broadcasting to pay re-transmission fees for games that the station televised outside of its six-state cable footprint. Similar issues also prevented Gaylord from buying the 58% interest by majority-owner Eddie Chiles, a share that Chiles would ultimately sell in a $46-million deal to an ownership group led by eventual Texas Governor and U.S. President George W. Bush, real estate developer H. Bert Mack and investor Frank L. Morsani in April 1989.

Ueberroth's successor, Fay Vincent, took a more hard-line approach against baseball telecasts shown over superstations. During his two-year tenure as league commissioner, he tried to introduce contract language in local broadcast agreements that would allow a team to terminate the contract if broadcasts were re-transmitted "by any means" to more than 200,000 homes outside the team's territory, launched a petition to the FCC to redefine how its non-duplication rules constitute a "network program" to force cable systems to blackout superstation-licensed live sports broadcasts, and asked Congress for the repeal the compulsory copyright license and the inclusion of an amendment to the Cable Television Consumer Protection and Competition Act of 1992 that would force superstations to enforce blackouts of sporting events if a conflict occurred with a local telecast of the same game. (The latter amendment spurred an on-air campaign by Turner Broadcasting, which saw responses, mostly opposed to the proposed legislation, by more than 17,000 viewers.) Then in July 1992, in a move seen by some as targeting the Cubs' WGN telecasts, Vincent ordered a realignment of the National League (NL) that sought to move the Chicago Cubs and the St. Louis Cardinals to the National League West and the Atlanta Braves and the Cincinnati Reds to the National League East starting with the 1993 season. Tribune staunchly opposed the proposed realignment, filing a breach of contract lawsuit accusing Vincent of overstepping his authority in ordering the realignment and arguing it would dilute existing team rivalries. (The realignment proposal also sparked concerns that local advertising revenue for WGN's prime time newscast would be depressed by frequent post-9:00 p.m. [Central Time] delays during the regular season from an increased number of Cubs games involving Pacific Time Zone-based Western Division teams starting in the late evening in the eastern half of the country. The Braves as well as the Cubs' American League [AL] rivals, the Chicago White Sox, had each already played many late-evening [Eastern/Central Time] games during the regular and postseason against West Coast teams in the western divisions of the National and American Leagues.) U.S. District Judge Suzanne B. Conlon issued a preliminary injunction in favor of Tribune and the Cubs on July 23, 1992, six weeks prior to an 18-9-1 motion of no confidence against Vincent among team owners on September 4. Impacts to baseball's attempts to curb superstation telecasts were felt following Vincent's subsequent resignation as MLB Commissioner on September 7, 1992; one week after his departure, the proposed blackout amendment failed to make a Cable Television Act reconciliation bill due to the lack of support for the provision in the Senate.

The NBA also undertook actions to limit superstation telecasts of the league's games. In 1982, it began prohibiting television stations that reached at least 5% of all out-of-market cable households from airing games that conflicted with those shown on the league's national cable partners (at the time, ESPN and USA Network); this transitioned in June 1985 to a 25-game limit on the number of seasonal NBA telecasts that could be licensed to superstations (sixteen fewer than the 41-game maximum under existing NBA local broadcast rules). Concerned with the potential impact that the concurring returns of the Chicago Bulls and the Atlanta Hawks to WGN and WTBS, respectively, would have on its national contracts with NBC and ESPN, in April 1990, NBA Commissioner David Stern further reduced the amount of superstation-licensed NBA telecasts to 20 games per season. This sparked a 5½-year legal battle against the NBA by Tribune Broadcasting and Chicago Bulls parent Chicago Professional Sports L.P. The conspiracy and antitrust lawsuit filed by the co-plaintiffs in the United States District Court for the Northern District of Illinois on October 16, 1990, alleged that the 20-game limit was aimed at "phas[ing] out such superstations telecasts entirely in increments of five games each year over the next five years," a separate plan proposed by Stern that was never voted upon by NBA team owners. (The NBA contended the restriction was exempt from antitrust law under a provision of the Sports Broadcasting Act of 1961, which was deemed in later rulings to only be applicable to the sale or transfer a national game package to a television network and not those involving individual teams.) After four separate rulings in favor of Tribune and the Bulls issued by Northern District Judge Hubert L. Will (on January 26, 1991, and January 6, 1995), the Seventh Circuit Court of Appeals (on April 14, 1992), and the U.S. Supreme Court (on November 5, 1992), a Seventh Circuit judiciary panel overturned their 1992 ruling on September 10, 1996, which forced WGN-TV – which had been allowed to air at least 30 Bulls telecasts over its local and national feeds between the 1992–93 and 1995–96 seasons per agreement between the lawsuit parties – to relegate the 35 Bulls games it was scheduled to air during the 1996–97 season exclusively to the Chicago area signal. (The embargoed Bulls telecasts were supplanted on the WGN superstation feed by syndicated feature films, and caused the national preemption of the station's 9:00 p.m. newscast on nights when prime time games overran into the time slot.) Tele-Communications Inc. (TCI, now defunct) cited the national restrictions on the Bulls as partly being behind its December 1996 decision to remove the WGN national feed from most of its systems throughout the country, affecting around 3.5 million TCI subscribers by March 1997, though criticism over the move led TCI to rescind its plans to remove the WGN national feed from affected systems in Illinois, Indiana, Iowa, Wisconsin and Michigan with the remaining systems reinstating WGN through 1999. The Bulls, WGN and the NBA reached a settlement on December 12, 1996, allowing WGN-TV to air the league broadcast maximum of 41 games for the remainder of the 1996–97 season (35 that would air only on the Chicago signal and twelve that would be shown on both the local and superstation feeds). From the 1997–98 season thereafter, the number of games permitted to air on the superstation feed increased to 15 per year. The parties also agreed to replace the NBA's licensing tax for superstations with a revenue sharing model, under which the NBA would collect 50% of all advertising revenue accrued from the national WGN telecasts.

TBS was able to work around these issues by supplementing its Atlanta-originated sports broadcasts with more nationalized sports fare, including a package of regular season NBA games involving the league's other teams, early round conference playoff games and the NBA Draft (beginning with the 1984–85 season and continuing until Turner Broadcasting shifted the NBA cable rights to sister channel TNT in 2002), professional wrestling programs from several promotions (including Georgia Championship Wrestling, the World Wrestling Federation [now the WWE], Jim Crockett Promotions, Mid-South Wrestling and finally, the Turner-owned World Championship Wrestling) until 2001, NCAA college football games (from 1981 to 1992 and from 2002 to 2007 season), various NASCAR auto races and the Olympics-inspired Goodwill Games. The WGN national feed also was prohibited from carrying Chicago Blackhawks hockey games, when WGN-TV assumed local rights to the team during the 2007–08 season, due to broadcast rights restrictions imposed by the NHL to protect the league's exclusive national broadcasting contracts with ESPN and later a joint broadcast-cable contract with NBCUniversal.

Evolution and decline; the remaining superstations
Even though superstations remained reasonably popular among cable and satellite subscribers, in no small part because of team-based sports broadcasts, various changes to the television industry beginning in the 1990s—especially the proliferation of cable-originated program services and the resultant increase in original programming produced by many cable channels—as well as existing distant signal policies—such as the syndication exclusivity rules—precipitated the decline in their viability. As early as 1986, with the launch of the Fox Broadcasting Company, a handful of the intrastate superstations – such as KMSP-TV (channel 9, now a Fox owned-and-operated station) in Minneapolis–St. Paul, KSHB-TV (channel 41, now an NBC affiliate) in Kansas City and WKBD-TV (channel 50, now a CW owned-and-operated station) in Detroit—that continued to maintain reasonable out-of-market distribution after the March 1983 copyright royalty increase had terminated their carriage agreements with cable providers beyond their home markets because of the presence of local independent stations that were able to serve as prospective Fox affiliates in many of the areas within the imported stations' remaining distribution footprint. Additional decline in the availability of intrastate superstations came in the mid-1990s, when many of the remaining regional superstations let their carriage agreements expire or terminated them outright amid local network affiliation shuffles that caused stations such as KTVT, KSTW and KPHO-TV (channel 5, now a CBS affiliate) in Phoenix taking on affiliations with one of the Big Three networks (ABC, CBS or NBC), as contractual and federal restrictions prevented them from maintaining regional distribution upon becoming major network affiliates.

Very few of these stations reduced their distribution as a result of taking affiliations with either the United Paramount Network (UPN) or The WB Television Network. In fact, in December 1993, Time Warner permitted Tribune Broadcasting and United Video to have WGN-TV—which initially had intended to maintain a limited, if any, relationship with the network—act as a de facto national feed for The WB to cover smaller and mid-sized markets where extra time was needed for the network to fill absences in local affiliate coverage. (The Tribune Company held minority ownership in The WB from August 1995 until the founding of successor The CW in January 2006, when the company relinquished its interest to avoid partially shouldering The WB's shutdown expenses.) Station management had expressed concerns over the potential negative impacts fulfilling commitments to the network's soon-to-be-expanded program offerings would have on its sports broadcast rights and, by association, its national distribution; Time Warner rectified those issues by agreeing to reduce the network's initial schedule to one night per week (from two) in exchange for leasing airtime on the WGN national feed. WGN carried the full WB programming schedule—including the Kids' WB children's program block, which was not carried by the WGN Chicago signal until 2004—nationwide from the network's January 1995 launch until October 1999, when carriage of the network (outside Chicago) was discontinued upon mutual agreement between Time Warner and Tribune/United Video to limit programming conflicts with The WB's initial charter affiliates and other local broadcast and cable-only affiliates that joined the network over the previous four years. In direct contrast, WWOR (owned at the time by network parent Chris-Craft/United Television) restricted availability of UPN programming to its New York-area signal, believed to be the result of a network non-duplication claim filed by non-equity network partner Paramount Television that prohibited Eastern Microwave from using the WWOR EMI Service as a national UPN feed. The downside of the Paramount decision was that, from January 1995 until over-the-air digital multicasting became viable in the first half of the 2000s, it left most or all UPN programming unavailable in some mid-sized and most smaller markets where the network was not able, at least initially, to gain even secondary affiliate clearances.

WWOR—although it technically never gave up its superstation status—ceased distributing a national cable feed on December 31, 1996, a move made by Advance Entertainment Corporation (which assumed ownership of corporate cousin Eastern Microwave Inc. and its satellite distribution rights to WWOR and WSBK-TV earlier in 1996) to avoid having to pay an increased royalty fee for the first six months of 1997 that the Copyright Royalty Tribunal instituted on January 1, 1997. To the consternation of many cable systems because of how it marketed the action, weeks before the WWOR EMI Service was to be discontinued, Discovery Networks quickly purchased the feed's satellite transponder slot from Advance Entertainment to expand distribution of the fledgling Animal Planet network. About 12.5 million cable subscribers (most of which resided east of the Mississippi River) lost access to WWOR's programming as a consequence. Amid outcry from satellite dish owners, less than one week after the EMI Service feed was discontinued, the National Programming Service, LLC (NPS) subsidiary of carrier firm All American Direct uplinked the station's New York-area broadcast feed on a separate satellite transponder for exclusive distribution by satellite providers; since syndication exclusivity rules did not apply to home dish providers at the time, the NPS-delivered feed featured all syndicated and UPN network programs that could be seen by viewers in the New York City market. (Because of this, select cable providers picked up the NPS feed to serve as a default UPN programming source in markets where no local UPN affiliate existed, either due to the lack of a standalone fifth or sixth secular commercial station for an exclusive affiliation – particularly through the loss of affiliate clearances to The WB, as was the case in certain markets affected by that network's 1997 agreement with the Sinclair Broadcast Group – or the lack of a secondary clearance with an existing commercial network station.) The NPS-delivered feed was discontinued in 1999 to repurpose the transponder to distribute the national feed of Pax TV (now Ion Television), though Dish Network continues to distribute WWOR nationwide , primarily in areas that do not have a local MyNetworkTV affiliate.

TBS, the national version of WTBS, evolved into a hybrid superstation on January 1, 1998. Upon undertaking the operational conventions of a traditional basic cable service, the national channel—which, following a series of name alterations between 1987 and 1996, was known at the time as TBS Superstation—began to collect subscriber fees and, as it was now effectively exempt from the 1976 Copyright Act's signal modification restrictions, began offering systems the ability to lease advertising time to participating providers for the sale and insertion of local commercials. The TBS cable channel, however, retained the WTBS signal as its originating feed and continued to simulcast almost all of the programming seen in the Atlanta market (except for Atlanta-targeted advertisements, and customary weekend morning blocks of public affairs and syndicated educational programs intended to fulfill FCC public service and Children's Television Act requirements that were shown exclusively on WTBS). As a byproduct of a national broadcast deal reached between Turner/Time Warner and Major League Baseball that granted TBS rights to carry regular season and postseason games involving various MLB teams (ending its team-specific focus on games involving the Atlanta Braves that traced before it achieved national distribution), TBS eventually gave up its superstation status altogether on October 1, 2007, when the TBS cable channel and WTBS formally separated their programming schedules and branding. The former Atlanta broadcast feed concurrently changed its call letters to WPCH-TV (rebranding as "Peachtree TV") and began targeting its programming exclusively toward its home market, limiting its distribution within North America (outside the Atlanta market) to Canadian television providers that were already receiving the station prior to the TBS split.

The separation of TBS from its founding Atlanta parent left the WGN national feed – which became known as Superstation WGN in November 2002 and then as WGN America in May 2008 – as the last remaining superstation to be transmitted nationwide through all multichannel television distribution methods, whereas the other six remaining superstations are available only through satellite television. Into the 2000s, WGN America increasingly relied less on WGN-TV program simulcasts as fewer syndicated programs seen on the Chicago feed were able to be given national "full-signal" clearances, opting to plug holes in the schedule with more "SyndEx-proof" syndicated programs. (Programming shared between the national and local WGN feeds in later years consisted of a limited number of syndicated programs and selected feature films; most Chicago Cubs and White Sox baseball and select Bulls basketball games; select local news and public affairs programs; and certain local and syndicated specials.) The channel also chose not to carry newscasts and Chicago-originated lifestyle and entertainment programs that WGN-TV added to its schedule as the station began to better emphasize news and other locally produced content starting in 2008. Following the Tribune Company's emergence from Chapter 11 bankruptcy protection amid a debt-laden 2007 leveraged buyout by real estate investor Sam Zell and subsequent takeover by three private equity firms (Oaktree Capital Management, JPMorgan Chase and Angelo, Gordon & Co.), Tribune unveiled plans to turn WGN America into a conventional basic cable network incorporating original programming content, to increase the channel's visibility and stave off potential defections from television providers because of the expense of paying increasing copyright fees to transmit programs now readily available elsewhere. (Through this conversion, WGN America began phasing out all local news and sports programming simulcast with the Chicago signal, concluding with the removal of its morning and midday newscasts from WGN America's lineup on December 15, 2014.) WGN's superstation status ended (in the United States) on December 16, 2014, when all remaining simulcasts of the Chicago station's local news, public affairs and sports programming were removed from its schedule and the first carriage agreements that shifted WGN America from limited to expanded basic tiers (involving Comcast Xfinity systems in Chicago and four other major markets) went into effect. WGN-TV would eventually be made available throughout the United States once again in the spring of 2015, when antenna manufacturer Channel Master included the Chicago-area feed among the initial offerings on its short-lived over-the-top streaming service LinearTV.

The five remaining "true" superstations—WPIX, KTLA, KWGN-TV, WWOR-TV and WSBK-TV—are carried on some rural cable providers and via satellite through Dish Network and C-Band systems. Since the 1988 syndication exclusivity rules were implemented, WKAQ-TV (channel 2) in San Juan and WAPA-TV (channel 4) in Guaynabo, Puerto Rico have been the only American television stations to achieve superstation status, although neither fits the legal criteria of a superstation as defined by the FCC. WKAQ's signal became available in the mainland United States in 2001, when Telemundo Group converted its Telemundo Internacional cable channel—which began as a cable news channel under the name Telenoticias in 1994—into a national feed of the station, branded as Telemundo Puerto Rico; the feed is available in the contiguous United States through select cable providers and via satellite on Dish Network and DirecTV. LIN Television Corp. began distributing a direct-to-satellite national feed of WAPA-TV, WAPA America, on September 1, 2004, through DirecTV's Para Todos Spanish-language tier; WAPA America is also available through select cable providers and on Dish Network. (Unlike the five superstations licensed within the U.S. mainland, WAPA's programming is generally "SyndEx-proof" as its schedule consists of domestically produced programs and acquired programming not widely available on broadcasters elsewhere within the Continental United States.) Since its inception in 1994, Dish Network has offered an a la carte tier of all five aforementioned mainland superstations to subscribers outside of the stations' respective home markets. The tier continued to be sold for many years following the 1999 passage of the Satellite Home Viewer Improvement Act, despite concerns expressed by representatives for former Dish parent EchoStar that prevalent program blackouts caused by requests from local broadcast licensees made under SHVIA syndication exclusivity and sports blackout provisions could force it to drop the five mainland superstations from its lineup. Indeed, such requests have led Dish Network to stop offering one or more of the stations in some markets in recent years, culminating in Dish ceasing all future sales of the superstation tier on September 19, 2013. (A grandfathering waiver exists for subscribers who purchased the tier prior to the cut-off date, allowing them to continue receiving the superstation package barring they ever cancel their subscription to the tier or to Dish Network.)

Canada
Canada does not have any television stations that operate as "superstations" in the traditional construct of the term. Technically, virtually every Canadian terrestrial television station is a superstation, as almost every local television station in that country – most commonly those that are owned-and-operated stations, as well as a few affiliates, of the five national English-language networks (CBC Television; the CTV Television Network and its companion system, CTV 2; Citytv; and the Global Television Network), and the three French language networks (Ici Radio-Canada Télé, V, and TVA) – are carried nationally by one or both of the country's satellite providers, Bell Satellite TV and Shaw Direct, and any of these stations can be carried by any Canadian cable provider at minimum on a digital cable programming tier. The closest Canadian equivalents to the "superstation" model are the television system, to some extent (basically acting as a smaller, less-centralized form of the network model), and, moreso, the independent station (the number of which had grown to some extent with the 2009 demise of E!—a sister system to Global that was originally known as CH from its founding in 2001 until 2007—although some have become affiliates of other networks and systems).

Beginning in the late 1980s, Canadian Satellite Communications (Cancom, now Shaw Broadcast Services) began distributing the signals of independents CHAN-TV (channel 8, now a Global owned-and-operated station) in Vancouver, British Columbia, CITV-TV (channel 13, now a Global owned-and-operated station) in Edmonton, Alberta, and CHCH-TV (channel 11) in Hamilton, Ontario, primarily for distribution by cable systems in smaller markets throughout Canada. Coincidentally, these stations were, like Cancom, either owned or later acquired by Western International Communications (WIC). As a result of their early availability, which predated the existence of most Canadian specialty channels, these stations – the former two of which are now owned by Corus Entertainment and the latter by Channel Zero – continue to maintain a superstation-type status on analog cable in many smaller Canadian communities as well as on border-area cable systems in the United States (such as Buffalo–Niagara Falls, New York, Burlington, Vermont, and Bellingham, Washington).

Presently, both the aforementioned CHCH and CJON-DT (channel 21) in St. John's, Newfoundland and Labrador use slogans referring to each as a "superstation," though neither station has any special regulatory status at present conferring that title. Neither CHCH nor CJON holds a formal network affiliation, although the latter (which identifies under the "NTV" brand) carries news and entertainment programming from Global and news programming from CTV, and both stations carry programming from the country's only syndicator, the religious and secular family service yes TV. (CJON and CHCH are both notable for streaming their programming feeds to viewers in a superstation-type manner within and outside of Canada through their websites; yes TV and CBC Television also maintain free online live streams but restrict access to viewers with Canadian IP addresses. In both cases, only a limited amount of non-local programming is carried on the online feed.)

Moreover, multichannel television providers within Canada are able to distribute American television stations in their digital package, regardless of whether they are superstations or affiliates of the five major U.S. broadcast networks (ABC, NBC, CBS, Fox or The CW) that are authorized by the Canadian Radio-Television and Telecommunications Commission (CRTC), which maintains a list of foreign television channels approved for distribution by the agency. The CRTC authorizes five of the six designated American superstations (sans WAPA America) for carriage on domestic multichannel television providers. Under CRTC rules first implemented on October 26, 1983, to bolster domestic programming services (particularly both independently-owned and specialty services) by requiring providers to "link" U.S.-based services in discretionary tiers tied to Canadian services, all authorized American superstations typically are received mainly through a subscription to one or more domestic premium channels (such as Crave, Starz, Super Channel and/or Super Écran, and previously the now-defunct services Movie Central and Encore Avenue). Superstations included in Section "B" of the CRTC's Part II eligible services list are mandated to be packaged with premium services; however, under a related rule that allows for one superstation of the provider's choice to be carried on a non-premium tier, some television providers have chosen to offer either TBS/WPCH-TV, WGN-TV or WSBK in a specialty tier.

On April 4, 1985, the CRTC granted authorization for WTBS, WGN-TV, WPIX and WOR-TV to be distributed to cable providers within Canada under Section "B" of the Part II eligible services list. Three other superstations were given clearance by the CRTC under the Part II Section "B" list during the 1990s: WSBK-TV was granted authorization on April 29, 1991 (per a request by First Choice Canadian Communications Corporation, then-owner of premium service First Choice [now Crave]), KTLA was granted authorization on July 17, 1991, and KWGN was granted authorization on July 22, 1997. KTLA and KWGN were each placed under the Part III non-Canadian services list simultaneous with their placement on the Part II list. (KWGN-TV is the only one of the seven CRTC-approved superstations that has no cable or satellite availability within Canada.)

TBS was removed from the Canadian market when it became a cable-exclusive channel in the U.S. in October 2007, as the CRTC had only given approval for its former parent Atlanta broadcast signal to be carried by cable, satellite and other multichannel television providers within the country; for this reason, Canadian viewers instead receive the rechristened WPCH-TV. (WPCH is one of only two superstations eligible under the Commission's foreign distribution list, along with WGN-TV as a result of its programming separation from its WGN America companion service in December 2014, that is no longer distributed in the United States as a regional or national superstation.) Similarly, on January 17, 2007, common carrier firm Shaw Broadcast Services ceased distribution of the WGN national feed in favor of offering the station's Chicago signal, a decision believed to have resulted from increased licensing fees for the then-superstation feed. (Some providers, including MTS TV and Cogeco Cable, continued to carry the superstation feed afterward in place of or in conjunction with the Chicago signal.)

Mexico
Much as is the case in Canada, almost all of the commercial and non-commercial television stations in Mexico are available on satellite to be carried on cable and other direct-to-home (DTH) television providers within the country. However, no station had equal transmission nationwide: certain laws, such as the electoral law, forbid television stations from broadcasting advertisements (particularly, political campaign ads) originating from other states or regions within the country. The country's telecommunications agency, the Federal Telecommunications Institute (IFT), also mandates that direct-broadcast satellite providers carry the signals of stations that are part of television networks that cover 50% of the Mexican territory, albeit with regional lockouts for advertisements.

Radio superstations
The first radio station in North America to achieve superstation distribution via satellite was Chicago's WFMT (98.7 FM), a classical music station that was uplinked by United Video to the Satcom I satellite in May 1979, which began distributing its signal via satellite as a cable radio feed throughout the United States and was also distributed in over two dozen countries overseas (including the Soviet Union and China). Like with fellow United Video-distributed superstation WGN-TV in that same market during its early years as a cable superstation, other than some limited revenue from a scant number of national advertisers, WFMT earned no extra revenue from its expanded distribution. (Incidentally, WFMT was co-owned with WGN-TV from 1968 until 1970, when WGN Continental Broadcasting donated the WFMT assets to the Chicagoland Educational Television Association, owner of local PBS station WTTW [channel 11].) WSM (650 AM) in Nashville, Tennessee, also received a lot of attention in the 1980s through its distribution via C-band alongside The Nashville Network (which was co-owned with WSM radio at the time through Gaylord Entertainment). Very few stations actually distribute themselves through C-band, as the station's audio can now more easily be dialed in through either ISDN lines, or listened to via an audio stream over the internet (if the station offers such a service). Radio stations that relay their audio feed via C-band, like WEEI-FM (93.7) in Boston, often do so to feed the signal to others that simulcast the programming throughout the New England region. This is the case with several stations in Mexico, as radio and television broadcasting in that country is very nationalized and most local stations merely act as 24-hour-a-day affiliates of a national network.

Some local radio stations are, or have been distributed on satellite radio throughout the United States, and Canada in select cases. Stations that have previously maintained distribution over satellite radio have included WLTW (106.7 FM) in New York City, KHMX (96.5 FM) in Houston, KIIS-FM (102.7) in Los Angeles, KNEW (960 AM) in San Francisco, WTKS-FM (104.1) in Orlando, WLW (700 AM) in Cincinnati and WSIX-FM (97.9 FM) in Nashville on XM Satellite Radio, and WSM on Sirius Satellite Radio. XM, in particular, used radio-based superstations owned by Clear Channel Communications (now iHeartMedia) for much of its channel lineup during the early years of the provider's existence; the two Clear Channel radio superstations that remained on its lineup – WLW and WSIX – were dropped by XM Satellite Radio in March 2009. The signals of WSIX, KIIS and WLTW returned to the now-merged Sirius XM lineup in June 2011, along with two new additions, CHR station WHTZ (100.3 FM) in New York City and urban contemporary outlet WGCI-FM (107.5) in Chicago. All iHeartMedia stations have since been removed from Sirius XM as a byproduct of the launch and growth of co-owned streaming radio platform iHeartRadio; WGCI, WLTW, and WSIX were removed in 2013 after Clear Channel sold its stake in Sirius XM, WHTZ left the satellite service in June 2020 with a stream continuing on Sirius XM's online service, and KIIS was removed in June 2022, along with the Sirius XM-hosted WHTZ simulcast.

Three other specialty format stations—WBBR (1130 AM) in New York City, the flagship affiliate of the Bloomberg Radio business news service; WCSP-FM (90.1) in Washington, D.C., the sole affiliate of C-SPAN Radio; and KBYR-HD2 (89.1 FM HD2) in Provo, Utah, part of Brigham Young University's BYU Radio service—are currently distributed on satellite radio, the former two of which are in lieu of their parent services maintaining conventional full-time affiliations with other radio properties across the United States. Most of WBBR's programming is also syndicated terrestrially to other stations through United Stations Radio Networks. (KPIG-FM [107.5] in Santa Cruz, California ended its terrestrial syndication deal with Dial Global in March 2010, becoming one of the few radio stations to place its audio stream behind a paywall; this made WBBR the only terrestrial superstation on U.S. radio.) KDIS (1110 AM, now KRDC) in Pasadena, California (serving the Los Angeles market) converted to superstation status in 2014, a byproduct of Radio Disney – for which it serves as the children's radio network's flagship outlet, and became its only analog terrestrial broadcaster as a result – refocusing its efforts primarily on mobile distribution after drawing down its remaining affiliates through both the sales or shutdowns of its owned-and-operated stations and the format conversions of terrestrial affiliates not owned by The Walt Disney Company. (Radio Disney began to reinstate conventional terrestrial radio coverage in 2016 through brokered arrangements over HD Radio subchannels, albeit with a drastically reduced affiliate base than it had up until the early 2010s.)

Prior to CBS Corporation's 2017 sale of its radio properties to Entercom, in 2011, CBS Radio began using HD Radio technology to relay the signals of its major-market music-formatted stations to other markets around the country. For instance, KFRG (95.1 FM) in San Bernardino is carried on KTWV-HD3 (94.7 FM HD3) in Los Angeles, KSCF (103.7 FM, now KSON) in San Diego is heard on KAMP-HD2 (97.1 FM HD2) in Los Angeles; WBZ-FM (98.5 FM) in Boston was heard on WTIC-HD3 (96.5 FM HD3) in Hartford up until after Entercom sold WBZ-FM to the Beasley Broadcast Group in November 2017; KROQ-FM (106.7) in Los Angeles was formerly heard on KEGY (97.3 FM, now KWFN) in San Diego; and both WXRK-HD2 (92.3 FM HD2, now WINS-FM), and WFAN (660 AM) in New York City are respectively simulcast on three affiliates – WOCL-HD3 (105.9 FM HD3) in Orlando, WLLD-HD3 (94.1 FM HD3) in Tampa, and WEAT-HD3 (107.9 FM HD3) in West Palm Beach – in Florida.

In many cases where radio stations distribute outside their home market, the local stations make some concessions, such as replacement of local advertisements with either national advertising or a bed of production music that plays over commercial breaks. Also in the example of WFAN, that station's play-by-play coverage of the New York Mets and Giants, the New Jersey Devils and the Brooklyn Nets is not carried on the Florida HD Radio affiliates and replaced with alternate programming, as the station only has rights to transmit the game broadcasts in the New York metropolitan area.

List of superstations

Current

Former

See also
 Major League Baseball on superstations

Notes

Television terminology
 
Television in the United States
Radio broadcasting